LFW may refer to:

 Lomé–Tokoin Airport (IATA code)
 London Fashion Week
 Lakme Fashion Week
 Leo Fortune-West, (born 1971), English footballer
 Laser Focus World, a magazine
 Linear friction welding
 LFW, a High Feature engine manufactured by General Motors
 Lost for Words (disambiguation), several meanings